Plagiostachys is a genus of plants in the Zingiberaceae. It is native to Southeast Asia.

 species

References

Alpinioideae
Zingiberaceae genera